Chernyakhovsky District is an administrative district (raion), one of the fifteen in Kaliningrad Oblast, Russia. As a municipal division, it is incorporated as Chernyakhovsky Municipal District. It is located in the center of the oblast. Its administrative center is the town of Chernyakhovsk. Population:  57,521 (2002 Census);  The population of Chernyakhovsk accounts for 77.9% of the district's total population.

Transportation
The main railway line from Kaliningrad to Moscow passes through the district; there are two more railway lines from Chernyakhovsk to Zheleznodorozhny and from Chernyakhovsk to Sovetsk. The main road from Kaliningrad to Moscow via Lithuania also passes through the district.

References

Notes

Sources

Districts of Kaliningrad Oblast
 
